Andries Gryffroy (born 1963) is a Belgian politician and a member of the New Flemish Alliance party.

Biography
Gryffroy was born in 1963 in Roeselare. He studied engineering course at Groep T in Leuven and worked for an energy company before founding a business. He was a member of the youth wing of the former Volksunie party before joining the N-VA. In 2011, he became the N-VA's general secretary and was party leader in the East Flanders Provincial Council. Since 2014, he has been a member of the Flemish Parliament and the Belgian Senate. In parliament, he sits on the Committee for Culture, Youth, Sport and Media.

Gryffroy is married and has two adopted children who were born in Vietnam.

Notes

1963 births
Living people
People from Roeselare
New Flemish Alliance politicians
Members of the Flemish Parliament
Members of the Senate (Belgium)
21st-century Belgian politicians